Indigenous Australian art includes art made by Aboriginal Australian and Torres Strait Islander peoples, including collaborations with others. It includes works in a wide range of media including painting on leaves, bark painting, wood carving, rock carving, watercolour painting, sculpting, ceremonial clothing and sand painting; art by Indigenous Australians that pre-dates European colonisation by thousands of years, up to the present day.

Traditional Indigenous art
There are several types of and methods used in making Aboriginal art, including rock painting, dot painting, rock engravings, bark painting, carvings, sculptures, weaving and string art. Australian Aboriginal art is the oldest unbroken tradition of art in the world.

Stone art

Rock art, including painting and engraving or carving (petroglyphs), can be found at sites throughout Australia. Examples of rock art have been found that are believed to depict extinct megafauna such as Genyornis and Thylacoleo in the Pleistocene era as well as more recent historical events such as the arrival of European ships.

The oldest examples of rock art, in Western Australia's Pilbara region and the Olary district of South Australia, are estimated to be up to around 40,000 years old. The oldest firmly dated evidence of rock art painting in Australia is a charcoal drawing on a small rock fragment found during the excavation of the Narwala Gabarnmang rock shelter in south-western Arnhem Land in the Northern Territory. Dated at 28,000 years, it is one of the oldest known pieces of rock art on Earth with a confirmed date. It is thought this decorated fragment may have once formed part of a larger ceiling artwork, however, the shape of the original motif is unknown. The oldest reliably dated unambiguous, in-situ rock art motif in Australia is a large painting of a macropod from a rock shelter in Western Australia's Kimberley region, radiometrically dated in a February 2021 study at approximately 17,300 years old.

Gwion Gwion rock art (the "Bradshaw rock paintings", also referred to as Giro Giro"), initially named after Joseph Bradshaw, who first reported them in 1891, consists of a series of rock paintings on caves in the Kimberley region of Western Australia.  A 2020 study puts this art at about 12,000 years old.

The Maliwawa Figures were documented in a study led by Paul Taçon and published in Australian Archaeology in September 2020. The art includes 572 images across 87 sites in northwest Arnhem Land, from Awunbarna (Mount Borradaile) area across to the Wellington Range. They are estimated to have been drawn between 6,000 and 9,400 years ago. The find is described as very rare, not only in style, but in their depiction of bilbies (not known historically in Arnhem Land) and the first known depiction of a dugong. The art, all paintings in red to mulberry colour apart from one drawing, and in a naturalistic style, had not been described in the literature before this study. They are large, and depict relationships between people and animals, a rare theme in rock art. Bilbies, thylacines and dugong have been extinct in Arnhem land for millennia. The art was first seen by the 2008-2009 researchers, but were only studied in field research lasting from 2016 to 2018. The figures were named by Ronald Lamilami, a senior traditional owner. According to Tacon, "The Maliwawa back-to-back figures are the oldest known for western Arnhem Land and it appears this painting convention began with the Maliwawa style. It continues to the present with bark paintings and paintings on paper". Taçon draws comparisons between the Maliwawa Figures and George Chaloupka's Dynamic Figures style, where the subject matter consists of about 89 percent humans, compared with 42% of the Maliwawa Figures. There is, however, much complexity and debate regarding the classification of rock art style in Arnhem Land.

Other painted rock art sites include Laura, Queensland, Ubirr, in the Kakadu National Park, Uluru, and Carnarvon Gorge.

Rock engraving, or petroglyphs, are created by methods which vary depending on the type of rock being used and other factors. There are several different types of rock art across Australia, the most famous of which is Murujuga in Western Australia, the Sydney rock engravings around Sydney in New South Wales, and the Panaramitee rock art in Central Australia. The Toowoomba engravings, depicting carved animals and humans, have their own peculiar style not found elsewhere in Australia.

The rock engravings at Murujuga are said to be the world's largest collection of petroglyphs and includes images of extinct animals such as the thylacine. Activity prior to the last ice age until colonisation is recorded.

Stone arrangements
Aboriginal stone arrangements are a form of rock art constructed by Aboriginal Australians. Typically they consist of stones, each of which may be about 30 cm in size, laid out in a pattern extending over several metres or tens of metres. Each stone is well-embedded into the soil, and many have "trigger-stones" to support them. Particularly fine examples are in the state of Victoria, where some examples have very large stones. The appearance of the site is similar to that of the megalithic stone circles found throughout Britain (although the function and culture are presumably completely different). Although its association with Aboriginal Australians is well-authenticated and beyond doubt, the purpose is unclear, although it may have a connection with initiation rites. It has also been suggested that the site may have been used for astronomical purposes. 
Smaller stone arrangements are found throughout Australia, such as those near Yirrkala, which depict accurate images of the praus used by Macassan Trepang fishermen and spear throwers.

Wood carvings 
Wood carving has always been an essential part of Aboriginal culture, requiring wood, sharp stone to carve, wire and fire. The wire and fire were used to create patterns on the object by heating the wire with the fire and placing it on the wood carving.

Wood carvings such as those by Central Australian artist Erlikilyika shaped like animals, were sometimes traded to Europeans for goods.
The reason Aboriginal people made wood carvings was to help tell their Dreaming stories and pass on their group's lore and essential information about their country and customs. They were also used in ceremonies, such as the ilma.

Aboriginal people from the Tiwi Islands traditionally carved pukumani grave posts, and since the 1960s have been carving and painting iron wood figures.

Textiles
In most Pacific areas the men oversee the art and architecture; the women oversee the art in felted cloth they would make from tree bark and plants. The art in clothing is supervised by the head woman in charge of the production. These detailed clothes were worn for rituals; each represented wealth and rank in the group. The sacred clothing is also used in trade goods and social and political relationships. Wearing the textile then removing it and giving it to another person helped to bond or reinforce friendship or alliances.

Baskets and weaving
 
Baskets, sometimes coiled baskets, were created by twisting bark, palm-leaf, and feathers; some of the baskets were plain and some were created with feather pendants or feathers woven in the frame of the basket. The artists used mineral and plant dyes to colour the palm-leaves and bark of the hibiscus. These string bags and baskets were used in ceremonies for religious and ritual needs; the baskets might have been also used for carry things back to the village.

Basket weaving has been traditionally practised by the women of many Aboriginal Australian peoples across the continent for centuries.

Jewellery
Aboriginal people created shell pendants which were considered high value and often used for trading goods. These shells were attached to string, which was handmade from human hair and sometimes covered with a type of grease and red ochre. This jewellery would sometimes be hung around a man’s neck or waist for use during ceremonies.

Kalti paarti 
Kalti paarti carving is a traditional art form made by carving emu eggs. It is not as old as some other techniques, having originated in the nineteenth century.

Symbols

Certain symbols within the Aboriginal modern art movement retain the same meaning across regions although the meaning of the symbols may change within the context of a painting. When viewed in monochrome other symbols can look similar, such as the circles within circles, sometimes depicted on their own, sparsely, or in clustered groups. Depending upon the group of which the artist is a member, symbols such as campfire, tree, hill, digging hole, waterhole, or spring can vary in meaning. Use of the symbol can be clarified further by the use of colour, such as water being depicted in blue or black.

Many paintings by Aboriginal artists, such as those that represent a Dreaming story, are shown from an aerial perspective. The narrative follows the lie of the land, as created by ancestral beings in their journey or during creation. The modern day rendition is a reinterpretation of songs, ceremonies, rock art, body art and ceremonies (such as awelye) that was the norm for many thousands of years.

Whatever the meaning, interpretations of the symbols should be made in context of the entire painting, the region from which the artist originates, the story behind the painting, and the style of the painting.

Religious and cultural aspects of Aboriginal art

Some natural sites were sacred to them, and were also the location where seasonal rituals were performed. During these rituals the Aboriginal people created art such as feather and fibre objects, they painted and created rock engravings, and also painted on bark of  the Eucalyptus tetrodonta trees. While stories differed among the clans, language groups, and wider groups, the Dreaming (or Jukurrpa) is common to all Aboriginal peoples. As part of these beliefs, during ancient times mythic Aboriginal ancestor spirits were the creators of the land and sky, and eventually became a part of it. The Aboriginal peoples' spiritual beliefs underpin their laws, art forms, and ceremonies. Traditional Aboriginal art almost always has a mythological undertone relating to the Dreaming.

Wenten Rubuntja, an Indigenous landscape artist, says it is hard to find any art that is devoid of spiritual meaning:
Doesn't matter what sort of painting we do in this country, it still belongs to the people, all the people. This is worship, work, culture. It's all Dreaming. There are two ways of painting. Both ways are important, because that's culture. – source The Weekend Australian Magazine, April 2002

Story-telling and totem representation feature prominently in all forms of Aboriginal artwork. Additionally, the female form, particularly the female womb in X-ray style, features prominently in some famous sites in Arnhem Land. X-ray styles date back all the way to 2000–1000 BCE. It is an Indigenous technique where the artist creates conceptualised X-ray, transparent , images. The mimi, spirits who taught the art of painting to the Aboriginal people, and ancestors are "released" through these types of artwork.

Graffiti and other destructive influences
Many culturally significant sites of Aboriginal rock paintings have been gradually desecrated and destroyed by encroachment of early settlers and modern-day visitors. This includes the destruction of art by clearing and construction work, erosion caused by excessive touching of sites, and graffiti. Many sites now belonging to National Parks have to be strictly monitored by rangers, or closed off to the public permanently.

Torres Strait Islander art

Mythology and culture, deeply influenced by the ocean and the natural life around the islands, have always informed traditional artforms. Featured strongly are turtles, fish, dugongs, sharks, seabirds and saltwater crocodiles, which are considered totemic beings.

Elaborate headdresses or dhari (also spelt dari), as featuried on the Torres Strait Islander Flag, are created for the purposes of ceremonial dances. The dari was historically worn by Torres Strait warriors in battle. It is seen as a powerful symbol of the Torres Strait Islander people, today representing peace and harmony. World-renowned artist Ken Thaiday Snr has created elaborate dharis using modern materials in his contemporary artwork.

Torres Strait Islander people are the only culture in the world to make turtleshell masks, known as krar (turtleshell) in the Western Islands and le-op (human face) in the Eastern Islands.

Prominent among the artforms is wame (alt. wameya), many different string figures.

The Islands have a long tradition of woodcarving, creating masks and drums, and carving decorative features on these and other items for ceremonial use. From the 1970s, young artists were beginning their studies at around the same time that a significant re-connection to traditional myths and legends was happening. Margaret Lawrie's publications, Myths and Legends of the Torres Strait (1970) and Tales from the Torres Strait (1972), reviving stories which had all but been forgotten, influenced the artists greatly. While some of these stories had been written down by Haddon after his 1898 expedition to the Torres Strait, many had subsequently fallen out of use or been forgotten.

In the 1990s a group of younger artists, including the award-winning Dennis Nona (b.1973), started translating these skills into the more portable forms of printmaking, linocut and etching, as well as larger scale bronze sculptures. Other outstanding artists include Billy Missi (1970-2012), known for his decorated black and white linocuts of the local vegetation and eco-systems, and Alick Tipoti (b.1975). These and other Torres Strait artists have greatly expanded the forms of Indigenous art within Australia, bringing superb Melanesian carving skills as well as new stories and subject matter. The College of Technical and Further Education on Thursday Island was a starting point for young Islanders to pursue studies in art. Many went on to further art studies, especially in printmaking, initially in Cairns, Queensland and later at the Australian National University in what is now the School of Art and Design. Other artists such as Laurie Nona, Brian Robinson, David Bosun, Glen Mackie, Joemen Nona, Daniel O'Shane and Tommy Pau are known for their printmaking work.
 
An exhibition of Alick Tipoti's work, titled Zugubal, was mounted at the Cairns Regional Gallery in July 2015.

Contemporary Indigenous art

Modern Aboriginal artists 

In 1934 Australian painter Rex Batterbee taught Aboriginal artist Albert Namatjira western style watercolour landscape painting, along with other Aboriginal artists at the Hermannsburg mission in the Northern Territory. It became a popular style, known as the Hermannsburg School, and sold out when the paintings were exhibited in Melbourne, Adelaide and other Australian cities. Namatjira became the first Aboriginal Australian citizen, as a result of his fame and popularity with these watercolour paintings.

In 1966, one of David Malangi's designs was produced on the Australian one dollar note, originally without his knowledge. The subsequent payment to him by the Reserve Bank marked the first case of Aboriginal copyright in Australian copyright law.

In 1988 the Aboriginal Memorial was unveiled at the National Gallery of Australia in Canberra made from 200 hollow log coffins, which are similar to the type used for mortuary ceremonies in Arnhem Land. It was made for the bicentenary of Australia's colonisation, and is in remembrance of Aboriginal people who had died protecting their land during conflict with settlers. It was created by 43 artists from Ramingining and communities nearby. The path running through the middle of it represents the Glyde River.

In that same year, the new Parliament House in Canberra opened with a forecourt featuring a design by Michael Nelson Tjakamarra, laid as a mosaic.

The late Rover Thomas is another well known modern Australian Aboriginal artist. Born in Western Australia, he represented Australia in the Venice Biennale of 1990. He knew and encouraged other now well-known artists to paint, including Queenie McKenzie from the East Kimberley / Warmun region, as well as having a strong influence on the works of Paddy Bedford and Freddy Timms.

In the late 1980s and early 1990s the work of Emily Kngwarreye, from the Utopia community north east of Alice Springs, became very popular. Although she had been involved in craftwork for most of her life, it was only when she was in her 80s that she was recognised as a painter. Her works include Earth's Creation. Her styles, which changed every year, have been seen as a mixture of traditional Aboriginal and contemporary Australian. Her rise in popularity has prefigured that of many Indigenous artists from central, northern and western Australia, such as Kngwarreye's niece Kathleen Petyarre, Angelina Pwerle, Minnie Pwerle, Dorothy Napangardi, Lena Pwerle, and dozens of others, all of whose works have become highly sought-after. The popularity of these often elderly artists, and the resulting pressure placed upon them and their health, has become such an issue that some art centres have stopped selling these artists' paintings online, instead placing prospective clients on a waiting list for work.

Current artists in vogue include Jacinta Hayes, popular for her iconic representation of "Bush Medicine Leaves" and "Honey Ants", Rex Sultan (who studied with Albert Namatjira), Trephina Sultan and Reggie Sultan, Bessie Pitjara and Joyce Nakamara, amongst others.

Despite concerns about supply and demand for paintings, the remoteness of many of the artists, and the poverty and health issues experienced in the communities, there are widespread estimates of an industry worth close to half a billion Australian dollars each year, and growing rapidly.

Papunya Tula and "dot painting"

In 1971–1972, art teacher Geoffrey Bardon encouraged Aboriginal people in Papunya, north west of Alice Springs to put their Dreamings onto canvas. These stories had previously been drawn on the desert sand, and were now given a more permanent form.

The dots were used to cover secret-sacred ceremonies. Originally, the Tula artists succeeded in forming their own company with an Aboriginal Name, Papunya Tula Artists Pty Ltd, however a time of disillusionment followed as artists were criticised by their peers for having revealed too much of their sacred heritage. Secret designs restricted to a ritual context were now in the market place, made visible to Australian Aboriginal painting. Much of the Aboriginal art on display in tourist shops traces back to this style developed at Papunya. The most famous of the artists to come from this movement was Clifford Possum Tjapaltjarri. Also from this movement is Johnny Warangkula, whose Water Dreaming at Kalipinya twice sold at a record price, the second time being $486,500 in 2000.

The Papunya Collection at the National Museum of Australia contains over 200 artifacts and paintings, including examples of 1970s dot paintings.

Issues

There have been cases of some exploitative dealers (known as carpetbaggers) that have sought to profit from the success of the Aboriginal art movements. Since Geoffrey Bardon's time and in the early years of the Papunya movement, there has been concerns about the exploitation of the largely illiterate and non-English speaking artists.

One of the main reasons the Yuendumu movement was established, and later flourished, was due to the feeling of exploitation amongst artists:
"Many of the artists who played crucial roles in the founding of the art centre were aware of the increasing interest in Aboriginal art during the 1970s and had watched with concern and curiosity the developments of the art movement at Papunya amongst people to whom they were closely related. There was also a growing private market for Aboriginal art in Alice Springs. Artists' experiences of the private market were marked by feelings of frustration and a sense of disempowerment when buyers refused to pay prices which reflected the value of the Jukurrpa or showed little interest in understanding the story. The establishment of Warlukurlangu was one way of ensuring the artists had some control over the purchase and distribution of their paintings."

Other cases of exploitation include:
 painting for a lemon (car): "Artists have come to me and pulled out photos of cars with mobile phone numbers on the back. They're asked to paint 10-15 canvasses in exchange for a car. When the 'Toyotas' materialise, they often arrive with a flat tyre, no spares, no jack, no fuel." 
 preying on a sick artist: "Even coming to town for medical treatment, such as dialysis, can make an artist easy prey for dealers wanting to make a quick profit who congregate in Alice Springs" 
 pursuing a famous artist: "The late (great) Emily Kngwarreye...was relentlessly pursued by carpetbaggers towards the end of her career and produced a large but inconsistent body of work." According to Sotheby's "We take about one in every 20 paintings of hers, and with those we look for provenance we can be 100% sure of."

In March 2006, the ABC reported art fraud had hit the Western Australian Aboriginal Art movements. Allegations were made of sweatshop-like conditions, fake works by English backpackers, overpricing and artists posing for photographs for artwork that was not theirs. A detective on the case said:
"People are clearly taking advantage...Especially the elderly people. I mean, these are people that, they're not educated; they haven't had a lot of contact with white people. They've got no real basic understanding, you know, of the law and even business law. Obviously they've got no real business sense. A dollar doesn't really have much of a meaning to them, and I think to treat anybody like that is just… it's just not on in this country."

In August 2006, following concerns raised about unethical practices in the Indigenous art sector, the Australian Senate initiated an inquiry into issues in the sector. It heard from the Northern Territory Art Minister, Marion Scrymgour, that backpackers were often the artists of Aboriginal art being sold in tourist shops around Australia: "The material they call Aboriginal art is almost exclusively the work of fakers, forgers and fraudsters. Their work hides behind false descriptions and dubious designs. The overwhelming majority of the ones you see in shops throughout the country, not to mention Darling, are fakes, pure and simple. There is some anecdotal evidence here in Darwin at least, they have been painted by backpackers working on industrial scale wood production."

The inquiry's final report made recommendations for changed funding and governance of the sector, including a code of practice.

Aboriginal art movements and cooperatives 

Australian Indigenous art movements and cooperatives have been central to the emergence of Indigenous Australian art. Whereas many western artists pursue formal training and work as individuals, most contemporary Indigenous art is created in community groups and art centres.

Many of the centres operate online art galleries where local and international visitors can purchase works directly from the communities without the need of going through an intermediary. The cooperatives reflect the diversity of art across Indigenous Australia from the north west region where ochre is significantly used; to the tropical north where the use of cross-hatching prevails; to the Papunya style of art from the central desert cooperatives. Art is increasingly becoming a significant source of income and livelihood for some of these communities.

Awards

The winners of the West Australian Indigenous Arts Awards were announced on 22 August 2013. From over 137 nominations from throughout Australia, Churchill Cann won the Best West Australian Piece (A$10,000) and North Queensland artist Brian Robinson won the Best Overall prize (A$50,000).

Traditional cultural expressions

Traditional knowledge and traditional cultural expressions are both types of indigenous knowledge, according to the definitions and terminology used in the UN Declaration on the Rights of Indigenous Peoples and by the World Intellectual Property Organization's (WIPO) Intergovernmental Committee on Intellectual Property and Genetic Resources, Traditional Knowledge and Folklore. "Traditional cultural expressions" is used by WIPO to refer to  "any form of artistic and literary expression in which traditional culture and knowledge are embodied. They are transmitted from one generation to the next, and include handmade textiles, paintings, stories, legends, ceremonies, music, songs, rhythms and dance".

Leading international authority on Indigenous cultural and intellectual property, Australian lawyer Terri Janke, says that  within Australian Indigenous communities, "the use of  the word  ‘traditional’ tends not to be preferred as it implies that Indigenous culture is locked in time".

Aboriginal art in international museums
Australian Indigenous art has been much studied in recent years and has gained much international recognition.

The Museum for Australian Aboriginal art "La grange" (at Neuchâtel, Switzerland) is one of the few museums in Europe that dedicates itself entirely to this kind of art. During seasonal exhibitions, works of art by internationally renowned artists are being shown. Also, the Musée du Quai Branly, Paris, has an "Oceania" collection, which includes works by Australian Aboriginal artists Lena Nyadbi, Paddy Nyunkuny Bedford, Judy Watson, Gulumbu Yunupingu, John Mawurndjul, Tommy Watson, Ningura Napurrula and Michael Riley.

Two museums that solely exhibit Australian Aboriginal art are the Museum of Contemporary Aboriginal Art, or Museum voor hedendaagse Aboriginal kunst, (AAMU), in Utrecht, Netherlands, and the Kluge-Ruhe Aboriginal Art Collection of the University of Virginia.

See also

 Art of Australia
 Australian Aboriginal fibre sculpture
 Dampier Rock Art Precinct
 List of Indigenous Australian art movements and cooperatives
 List of Indigenous Australian visual artists
 List of Stone Age art
 Memorial pole
 National Aboriginal & Torres Strait Islander Art Award
 National Indigenous Heritage Art Award
 Panaramitee Style

References

Further reading
 Bardon, G. (1979) Aboriginal Art of the Western Desert, Adelaide: Rigby
 Bardon, G. (1991) Papunya Tula: Art of the Western Desert, Ringwood VIC: McPhee Gribble (Penguin)
 Bardon, G. (2005) Papunya, A Place Made After the Story: The Beginnings of the Western Desert Painting Movement, University of Melbourne: Miegunyah Press
Den Boer, E. (2012). Spirit Conception: Dreams in Aboriginal Australia [PDF]. American Psychological Association
 Donaldson, Mike, Burrup Rock Art: Ancient Aboriginal Rock Art of Burrup Peninsula and Dampier Archipelago, Fremantle Arts Press, 2010. 
 Flood, J. (1997)  Rock Art of the Dreamtime:Images of Ancient Australia, Sydney: Angus & Robertson
 Johnson, V. (ed) (2007) Papunya painting: out of the desert, Canberra: National Museum of Australia
Kampen-ORiley, M. (2006). Art beyond the West. Upper Saddle River, NJ: Prentice Hall.
 Kleinert, S. & Neale, M. (eds.) (2000) The Oxford Companion to Aboriginal Art and Culture, Melbourne: Oxford University Press
 McCulloch, S. (1999) Contemporary Aboriginal Art: A guide to the rebirth of an ancient culture, St Leonards (Sydney): Allen & Unwin
 McIvor, Roy (2010). Cockatoo: My Life in Cape York. Stories and Art. Roy McIvor. Magabala Books. Broome, Western Australia. 
 Morphy, H. (1991) Ancestral Connections, London: University of Chicago Press
 Morphy, H. (1998) Aboriginal Art, London: Phaidon Press
 Myers, F. R. (2002) Painting Culture: The making of an Aboriginal High Art, Durham: Duke University Press
 Rothwell, N. (2007) Another Country, Melbourne: Black Inc.
 Ryan, M.D. and Keane, M. and Cunningham, S. (2008) Indigenous Art: Local Dreamings, Global Consumption, in Anheier, Helmut and Raj Isar, Yudhishthir, Eds. Cultures and Globalization: The Cultural Economy, London: Sage Publications, pp. 284–291
 Senate Standing Committee on the Environment, Communications, Information Technology and the Arts (2007), Indigenous Art: Securing the Future – Australia's Indigenous visual arts and craft sector, Canberra: The Senate
 Wright, F. (with Morphy, F. and Desart Inc.) (1999–2000) The Art and Craft Centre Story (3 vols), Woden: Aboriginal and Torres Strait Islander Commission
Kampen-ORiley, M. (2006). Art beyond the West. Upper Saddle River, NJ: Prentice Hall.
Thomas, M., & Neale, M. (2011). Exploring the legacy of the 1948 Arnhem Land expedition. Camberra: ANU E Press.
Morphy, H., Rosenfeld, A., Sutton, P., Keen, I., Berndt, C. H., Berndt, R. M., . . . Cavazzini, F. (2003). Aboriginal Australia. Retrieved 2018, from 73

External links

Indigenous Art Code, the industry code set up to promote integrity, transparency and accountability in dealing with Indigenous art
Aboriginal Art Directory, a comprehensive list of art centres, museums, galleries, along with Aboriginal art news and reviews
 
Association of Northern, Kimberley and Arnhem Aboriginal Artists
Australian Indigenous Art Trade Association
National Aboriginal & Torres Strait Islander Art Award: History
Culture Victoria – images and videos related to traditional art and artefacts
Australian Art Collector magazine's Guide to Indigenous Art Centres
Lockhart River Art
Remembering Forward. Australian Aboriginal Painting since 1960 at Museum Ludwig, Cologne, Germany
Discussion on Country, memory and art: Understanding Indigenous art, Howard Morphy, John Carty and Dr Michael Pickering , National Museum of Australia, Audio on demand, 8 December 2010
Papunya Painting: Out of the Desert, National Museum of Australia online exhibition 
Aboriginal Art Museum of Utrecht
Aboriginal Art Symbols and Symbolism

 
Folk art